This is the results breakdown of the local elections held in the Valencian Community on 10 June 1987. The following tables show detailed results in the autonomous community's most populous municipalities, sorted alphabetically.

Overall

City control
The following table lists party control in the most populous municipalities, including provincial capitals (shown in bold). Gains for a party are displayed with the cell's background shaded in that party's colour.

Municipalities

Alcoy
Population: 66,244

Alicante
Population: 258,112

Benidorm
Population: 33,842

Castellón de la Plana
Population: 127,440

Elche
Population: 175,649

Elda
Population: 55,994

Gandia
Population: 51,028

Orihuela
Population: 45,545

Paterna
Population: 34,373

Sagunto
Population: 55,862

Torrent
Population: 54,544

Torrevieja
Population: 17,169

Valencia

Population: 729,419

See also
1987 Valencian regional election

References

Valencian Community
1987